Bavette  ("bibs") is a type of pasta, a narrower version of tagliatelle. It is a ribbon noodle, similar to spaghetti, that has a flat section and a slightly convex shape. This type of pasta originates in Genoa and is the most typical type of Ligurian pasta cut. Bavette is arguably one of the more ancient types of long pasta. Bavette is highly similar to linguine. Bavette is most frequently paired with traditional pesto sauces, but also pairs well with vegetables.

See also
 Cuisine of Liguria
 List of Italian dishes

References

Cuisine of Liguria
Types of pasta